Graham Alexander MacGregor  is a British academic, professor of Cardiovascular Medicine at the Wolfson Institute, Queen Mary University of London 

MacGregor trained at Charing Cross Hospital where he was taught by the distinguished nephrologist, Professor Hugh de Wardener.   MacGregor's own speciality at this stage was also in kidney disease.   He developed an interest in the relationship between kidney function and high blood pressure which led him to a parallel campaigning role, attempting to persuade food manufacturers to reduce the quantity of salt in factory produced food.

More recently he has become chairman of Action on Sugar.

MacGregor is also honorary consultant physician at St George's Hospital, London, and a visiting professor at St George's Hospital Medical School, London.

He was appointed Commander of the Order of the British Empire (CBE) in the 2019 Birthday Honours for services to cardiovascular disease.

Recognition
McGregor was listed in the IoS Happy List, 2012.

References

External links

Living people
Year of birth missing (living people)
Academics of Queen Mary University of London
Commanders of the Order of the British Empire
Food policy in the United Kingdom
Salt researchers